Tom Zimmerschied (born 22 September 1998) is a German professional footballer who plays as a midfielder for 3. Liga club Hallescher FC.

Career
A former youth academy player of Bayern Munich and SpVgg Unterhaching, Zimmerschied joined VfR Garching ahead of 2017–18 Regionalliga season. On 10 August 2020, Austrian second division club Dornbirn 1913 announced the signing of Zimmerschied. He made his professional debut for the club on 12 September 2020 in 1–0 league win against Grazer AK.

In June 2021, Zimmerschied returned to Germany by signing for Hallescher FC.

References

External links
 
 

1998 births
Living people
German footballers
Association football midfielders
3. Liga players
Regionalliga players
2. Liga (Austria) players
FC Dornbirn 1913 players
Hallescher FC players
German expatriate footballers
German expatriate sportspeople in Austria
Expatriate footballers in Austria